Kon-Tiki is a Norwegian documentary film about the Kon-Tiki expedition led by Norwegian explorer and writer Thor Heyerdahl in 1947, released in Sweden, Norway, Finland, and Denmark in 1950, followed by the United States in 1951. The movie, which was directed by Thor Heyerdahl and edited by Olle Nordemar, received the Academy Award for Best Documentary Feature for 1951 at the 24th Academy Awards. The Oscar officially went to Olle Nordemar.

The Academy Film Archive preserved Kon-Tiki in 2013.

Content 
The movie has an introduction explaining Heyerdahl's theory, then shows diagrams and images explaining the building of the raft and its launch from Peru. Thereafter it is a film of the crew on board, shot by themselves, with commentary written by Heyerdahl and translated.  The whole film is black and white, shot on a single 16mm camera.

A small amount of color footage of Kon-Tiki does exist.

See also

 Kon-Tiki (2012 film)
 List of Academy Award trophies on public display

References

External links
 

1950 films
1950 documentary films
Anthropology documentary films
Best Documentary Feature Academy Award winners
Black-and-white documentary films
Documentary films about water transport
Films directed by Thor Heyerdahl
Films set in French Polynesia
Norwegian documentary films
1950s Norwegian-language films
Sailing films
Norwegian black-and-white films
Swedish black-and-white films
Swedish documentary films
1950s Swedish films